The Jewish Journal (Boston North) is an independent, community-sponsored Jewish newspaper serving the Jewish community of Essex County, Massachusetts north of Boston, and published bi-weekly on Fridays since 1976.  It is managed by a Board of Overseers representing points of view of the entire Jewish community. 
  
A grant from the Jewish Federation of The North Shore allows it to be distributed free of charge to all Jewish residents in a Beverly, Boxford, Byfield, Danvers, Essex, Georgetown, Gloucester, Hamilton, Ipswich, Lynn, Lynnfield, Manchester, Marblehead, Middleton, Nahant, Newbury, Newburyport, Peabody, Rockport, Rowley, Salem, Saugus, Swampscott, Topsfield, Wenham, and West Newbury. Jewish residents of Amesbury, Andover, Bradford, Groveland, Haverhill, Lawrence, Merrimac, Methuen, North Andover, and Salisbury must pay a subscription fee to receive the newspaper.
The current Publisher is Barbara Schneider, and Bette Keva is the Editor.

See also
List of Jewish newspapers in the United States

References

External links

American Jewish Press Association Member Profile

Publications established in 1976
Jewish newspapers published in the United States
Newspapers published in Massachusetts
Biweekly newspapers published in the United States